The Volvo Ladies Invitational was a women's professional golf tournament on the Ladies European Tour held in Sweden. It was played in 1980 and 1981 at Albatross Golf Club near Gothenburg. 

The tournament was the first LET event held in Sweden and only the second LET event outside the United Kingdom, after the WPGA European Championship held in France.

Format
The event was a limited field invitational with a field consisting of the top 24 players from the LET Order of Merit.

The tournament was played over three rounds with the score based on the best of the two first rounds along with the final round.

Winners

Source:

References

External links
Ladies European Tour

Former Ladies European Tour events
Golf tournaments in Sweden
Defunct sports competitions in Sweden
Recurring sporting events established in 1980
Recurring sporting events disestablished in 1981